No 208 (Reserve) Squadron was a reserve unit of the Royal Air Force, most recently based at RAF Valley, Anglesey, Wales. It operated the BAe Hawk aircraft, as a part of No. 4 Flying Training School. Due to obsolescence of its Hawk T.1 aircraft compared to the new-build Hawk T.2 aircraft of its sister unit, 4(R) Sqn, the squadron was disbanded in April 2016, in its 100th year of operations.

History

World War I
The squadron was established as part of the Royal Naval Air Service on 25 October 1916 at Dunkirk as No. 8 (Naval) Squadron. In its early days, the unit flew Sopwith Pups, 1½ Strutters and Nieuport Scouts. Later in World War I it re-equipped with Sopwith Camels and was assigned to artillery spotting. The squadron returned to the UK briefly before being sent back to France to face the German offensive. While in France a significant number of Camels belonging to the squadron were destroyed by the RAF to prevent the Germans capturing them during their advance. When the Royal Air Force was formed on 1 April 1918, the unit was renumbered to No. 208 Squadron RAF. After the war ended, 208 Squadron remained with the occupying forces until August 1919, when it again returned to the UK for disbandment on 7 November 1919 at Netheravon. For some time the squadron was based at the aerodrome at the Beaupré-sur-la-Lys Abbey in La Gorgue in northern France.

During the war, the squadron claimed 298 victories. Twenty-five aces had served in the squadron. Notable among them were 
Anthony Arnold, Charles Dawson Booker, Robert J. O. Compston, Harold Day, Stanley Goble, 
Edward Grahame Johnstone, William Lancelot Jordan, Robert A. Little, William E. G. Mann, Richard Munday, Guy William Price, George Simpson, Reginald Soar, Ronald Thornley, and James White.

Interbellum
The squadron re-formed at RAF Ismailia in Egypt on 1 February 1920 by the renumbering of No. 113 Squadron RAF. It was at first equipped with RE8s and from November 1920 till May 1930 with Bristol Fighters. In September 1922 the squadron was sent to Turkey for a year during the Chanak crisis, being stationed at San Stefano, a part of the Bakırköy district of Istanbul. After the conflict, 208 Squadron went back to Egypt and in 1930 got Armstrong Whitworth Atlas aircraft to replace the old Bristol fighters. The Atlases in their turn were replaced five years later by Audaxes and for one flight by Demons. Just before the outbreak of World War II, in January 1939, these gave way for the Westland Lysander.

World War II
No. 208 Squadron was still stationed in Egypt at the outbreak of World War II. It joined the war effort in mid-1940, flying Westland Lysander reconnaissance aircraft and Hawker Hurricane fighters on army co-operation duties in the North African Campaign and the Greek Campaign of 1941. During the war it included a significant number of Royal Australian Air Force and South African Air Force personnel, along with other nationalities. Amongst the members of the squadron at this time was Robert Leith-Macgregor, shot down on more than one occasion, once ending up taxiing through a minefield, but managing not to trigger any mines.

The unit was later stationed in Palestine, before returning to North Africa. It briefly converted to Curtiss Tomahawks, but received Supermarine Spitfires in late 1943 and flew them for the remainder of the war. From 1944, it took part in the Italian Campaign.

After World War II
Shortly after the war, 208 Squadron moved back to Palestine where it was involved in operations against the Egyptian Air Force. In 1948, the squadron moved to the Egyptian Canal Zone. It saw action in the 1948 Arab-Israeli War, losing four Spitfires in combat with Israeli Air Force aircraft (which also included Spitfires).

The last officially recorded "Air to Air fighter pilot kill" (bullets only, without guidance systems) occurred on 22 May 1948. At 09:30 two Egyptian Spitfire LF.9s staged a third attack on Ramat David. This time Fg Off Tim McElhaw and Fg Off Hully of 208 Squadron had taken over the standing patrol. Fg Off McElhaw, flying Spitfire FR.18 TZ228, intercepted and shot down both LF.9s.

In 1951, the squadron relocated to RAF Fayid where its Spitfires were replaced with Gloster Meteor jets. From there it moved to RAF Abu Sueir, relocating to RAF Takali, Malta, in August 1956, with interim spells earlier in the year at RAF Hal Far, Malta, and RAF Akrotiri, Cyprus. It disbanded at Takhali in January 1958, but re-formed the same month in the UK at RAF Tangmere from a nucleus of No. 34 Squadron RAF. In March 1958, re-equipped with Hunter FMk 6's, it returned to the Middle East, based at RAF Nicosia, with detachments to RAF Akrotiri and Aman, Jordan. The squadron disbanded at RAF Nicosia on 31 March 1959.

The next day, 1 April 1959, it re-formed at RAF Eastleigh, Nairobi, Kenya, by the re-numbering of No. 142 Squadron RAF under Squadron Leader R. Ramirez. It operated from Eastleigh from April 1959 to March 1960, being redeployed home to RAF Stradishall from March to June 1960, but returning to Eastleigh in June, sending detachments to Kuwait and Bahrain during the period. It was moved to RAF Khormaksar in Aden in November 1961, under Air Forces Arabian Peninsula, which became Air Forces Middle East the same year. In June 1964 it moved to Muharraq in Bahrain. The squadron remained in the Middle East until September 1971 when it was disbanded as a consequence of British drawdown of armed forces from East of Suez.

Flying Buccaneers

208 Squadron re-formed at RAF Honington in 1974 with Blackburn Buccaneer S2s, assigned to SACEUR in a low-level strike role. The squadron's twelve Buccaneers were declared operational to SACEUR from 1975 armed with 24 WE.177 nuclear weapons. The squadron was tasked with supporting land forces resisting an advance by the Warsaw Pact into western Europe, by striking at enemy forces, logistics and infrastructure beyond the forward edge of the battlefield, initially with conventional munitions, and with nuclear weapons in the event of escalation. The allocation of the British-owned WE.177 weapon freed the squadron from the time-consuming burden, at a critical time, of using US-owned nuclear weapons held in US custody at a central location. The squadron continued in this role, based at RAF Honington, until late 1983, when it moved base to RAF Lossiemouth and was reassigned to SACLANT for maritime strike duties. At Lossiemouth it flew alongside No. 12 Squadron RAF with the same role. The squadron's allocation of WE.177 nuclear weapons was reduced to twelve, one per aircraft, although the Buccaneer was able to carry two in its internal bomb bay. The squadron continued in this role until late 1993 when it relinquished its nuclear weapons. The unit was one of the last squadrons to operate the Buccaneer before it went out of service in 1994, and after the type's retirement the squadron again disbanded on 31 March 1994.

Between 1 October 1991 and November 1992, the Buccaneer Training Flight was formed as part of 208 Squadron at RAF Lossiemouth and operated the S.2B variant and some Hawker Hunter T.7's.

Transition to Hawk

208 Squadron re-formed again on 1 April 1994 from 234 (Reserve) Squadron, attached to No. 4 Flying Training School RAF. It moved to RAF Valley operating the BAe Hawk. The School was made up of two squadrons: 208 Squadron with the Hawk T Mk1 and No. 4(R) Squadron with the Hawk T Mk2.  Both squadrons provided Advanced Jet Flying Training and Tactical Weapons Training to prepare pilots for the front line on either the Tornado or Typhoon. 208(R) Squadron's Hawk tasks included:

Advanced flying and tactical weapons training
 To train RAF, RN and some foreign ab-initio pilots to Operation Conversion Unit (OCU) entry standard.
 To re-train RAF and RN multi-engine and rotary pilots to OCU entry standard.
 To refresh Shorts Tucano QFIs to OCU entry standard.

Instructor training     
 To train Hawk QFIs to B2 standard in accordance with the current Central Flying School (CFS) syllabuses.
 To upgrade Hawk QFIs to B1, A2 and A1 standard in accordance with 208(R) Squadron staff training requirements and CFS syllabuses.
 To train Hawk IREs in accordance with the current CFS syllabuses.
    
Conversion training
 To provide a common conversion course for all qualified pilots re-roling to the Hawk.
 To provide United Kingdom Orientation training for Foreign and Commonwealth pilots destined for fast-jet appointments.
 To provide conversion training for pilots destined for the Royal Air Force Aerobatics Team.

Incidents and accidents

On 20 April 2007, a BAE Hawk from the squadron crashed near RAF Mona. The pilot was taken to hospital and discharged soon after. The accident was caused by a solo student stalling the aircraft on an overshoot.

Centenary and disbandment

Despite conducting parallel training alongside the advanced Hawk TMk2 aircraft of 4(R) Squadron for several years, once 4(R) Squadron reached full output capacity, in January 2016 the Royal Air Force took a decision to disband 208(R) Squadron.

The Squadron celebrated its centenary on 1 April 2016 with the final student course graduation, a families' day and a formal dinner.  Shortly afterwards the Squadron disbanded, making its last flight on 13 April 2016 where three aircraft (two in centenary markings) led by OC 208(R) Squadron and the RAF Valley Station Commander overflew several landmarks linked with the Hawk TMk1. When it was handed back, it was estimated that over 1000 student pilots had been trained in the 208(R) Squadron building during its 22-year tenure at RAF Valley.  The Squadron Standard was lodged in the RAF church, St Clement Danes, at a ceremony on 22 May 2016, attended by squadron personnel, members of the 208 Squadron Association, Air Officer Commanding 22(Trg) Group and the Director of Flying Training.

Aircraft operated

Commanding Officers

References
Notes

Bibliography
 Johnstone, E.G., DSC (Editor). Naval Eight: A history of No.8 Squadron R.N.A.S. - afterwards No. 208 Squadron R.A.F - from its formation in 1916 until the Armistice in 1918. Naval and Military Press, 2006 (Reprint of the 1931, The Signal Press (London) Original Edition). .
 Halley, James J. The Squadrons of the Royal Air Force & Commonwealth 1918-1988. Tonbridge, Kent, UK: Air Britain (Historians) Ltd., 1988. .
 Jefford, C.G. RAF Squadrons, a Comprehensive Record of the Movement and Equipment of all RAF Squadrons and their Antecedents since 1912. Shrewsbury, Shropshire, UK: Airlife Publishing Ltd., 1998 (second edition 2001). .
 Johnstone, E.G. Naval Eight. The signal Press Ltd., 1931 (2nd edition Arms and Armour Press, 1972). .
 Marr, D.S.B., BSc. A History of 208 Squadron. Southend-on-Sea, Essex, UK: RAF/Eden Fisher (Southend) Ltd., 1966.
 Moyes, Philip J.R. Bomber Squadrons of the RAF and their Aircraft. London: Macdonald and Jane's (Publishers) Ltd., 1964 (new edition 1976). .

 Rawlings, John D.R. Fighter Squadrons of the RAF and their Aircraft. London: Macdonald & Jane's (Publishers) Ltd., 1969 (2nd edition 1976, republished 1978). .
 Rawlings, John D.R. The History of the Royal Air Force. Feltham, Middlesex, UK: Temple Press/Aerospace, 1984. .
 
 Styles, Dr. David G. 75 Years on - "The Flying Shuftis": Number 208 Squadron, Royal Air Force. Deerfield, Illinois: Dalton Watson, 1991. .
 Styles, Dr. David G. All the eights: Eight decades of Naval Eight/208. Loughborough, White Owl Press, 1996. .

External links

 208 Sqn on RAF website
 Air of Authority Squadron history
 Squadron website

208 Squadron
08 Squadron
Military units and formations established in 1916
Military units and formations of the Royal Air Force in World War I
Aircraft squadrons of the Royal Air Force in World War II
1916 establishments in the United Kingdom
Military units and formations in Mandatory Palestine in World War II
Military units and formations disestablished in 2016